Lethe jalaurida, the small silverfork, is a species of Satyrinae butterfly found in western China, Sikkim (northern India) and Burma.

References

jalaurida
Butterflies of Asia
Butterflies described in 1880